Pushpa Raj Pokharel is a Nepalese politician, belonging to the CPN (UML). He is a former Member of Parliament and a former Mayor of Bhadrapur.

References

Mayors of places in Nepal
Living people
Communist Party of Nepal (Unified Marxist–Leninist) politicians
Year of birth missing (living people)
Nepal MPs 1994–1999